Peter Rabbit is a computer-animated comedy television series for preschool children that debuted on Nick Jr. on December 14, 2012, in the United States and on the CBeebies channel and BBC One on December 25, 2012, in the United Kingdom. It is based on the character of the same name from Beatrix Potter's books for children. The series debuted on American TV and iTunes on December 14, 2012, with the pilot episode debuting as a Christmas holiday special, titled Peter Rabbit's Christmas Tale, and the show was becoming a regular series on February 19, 2013, in the USA. which was watched by three million viewers in the U.S. The first official DVD of Peter Rabbit was released on May 28, 2013, as a Walmart exclusive. it contains the programmes first eight episodes on a single disc. On October 11, 2013, Nickelodeon ordered a second series of 26 episodes. The series is also on the BBC Alba channel known as Peadar Kinnen. In Wales the series is known as Guto Gwningen dubbed into Welsh on S4C.

A springtime holiday special episode, titled Peter Rabbit's Springtime Tale (with the actual episode titled "The Tale of the Start of Spring"), aired on March 29, 2013, on iTunes in the USA.

Season 1 concluded on October 7, 2014, and the second season started airing for another year and a half until the show concluded on May 6, 2016, and there have been no plans yet to continue the show since then. The programme ran for two series from 2012 to 2016 and was produced for Nickelodeon in the US by Brown Bag Films, Penguin Books and Silvergate Media. The programme still airs reruns on CBeebies in the UK.

The series features and revolves around the titular character Peter Rabbit (voices of Colin DePaula and L. Parker Lucas in the US version and Connor Fitzgerald and Harry Henty in the UK version) and his younger cousin Benjamin Bunny (also called Benjamin Bouncer in this series: voice of Peter Steve Harris in the US version and Danny Price in the UK version) along with newcomer Lily Bobtail (voice of Michaela Dean in the US version and Harriet Perring (series 1) and Poppy Labrosse (series 2) in the UK version). The three rabbits experience many adventures in their woodland home across the lush Lake District: From daring radish raids in Mr. McGregor's garden to outwitting the wily fox Mr. Tod (voice of Mark Huckerby) and the bumbling badger Tommy Brock to helping their family and friends solve all sorts of problems. The programme features educational goals that encourage preschoolers to learn problem-solving and interpersonal skills, being aware, self-efficacy, resilience, positive re-framing and fostering an interest in and respect for nature.

Synopsis
The programme follows mischievous, charming Peter Rabbit and his friends as he overcomes obstacles, outwits predators and avoids danger. Peter wants to grow up to be just like his late father and carries his journal (a guide on how to be a good rabbit) on his adventures with his friends, Cousin Benjamin Bunny and new character Lily Bobtail, in the Lake District of northern England.

Voice cast

UK version
Connor Fitzgerald (Season 1) and Harry Henty (Season 2) as Peter Rabbit
Harriet Perring (Season 1) Poppy Labrosse (Season 2) as Lily Bobtail
Danny Price as Benjamin Bunny
Nigel Pilkington as Squirrel Nutkin
Mark A. Huckerby as Mr. Tod
JB Blanc as Tommy Brock
Dave B. Mitchell as Mr. McGregor, Old Brown
Joshua Colley as Pig Robinson
Gwenfair Vaughan as Mrs. Tiggywinkle
Justin P.G. Trefgarne as The Shrew, Dr. Warren Bobtail
Roger May as Jack-Black
Gemma Harvey as The Shrew
Sophie Aldred
Emma Tate
Dan Chambers as Jeremy Fisher, Ginger and Pickles, Jack Sharp
Laurence Kennedy
Sophia Waterton as Mittens

US version
Colin DePaula as Peter Rabbit (Season 1, 28 episodes, 2012–2014)
L. Parker Lucas as Peter Rabbit (Season 2, 28 episodes, 2014–2016)
Peter Steve Harris (56 episodes, 2012–2016) as Benjamin Bunny
Michaela Dean (56 episodes, 2012–2016) as Lily Bobtail
Kyle Massey (53 episodes, 2012–2016) as Squirrel Nutkin
Stephanie Sheh (Season 1) and Katie L. Koslowski (Season 2) as Josephine Rabbit
Megan Taylor Harvey as Flopsy, Mopsy (Season 1)
Brittany Harms as Flopsy (Season 2)
Sawyer Niehaus as Mittens and Mopsy (Season 2)
Jenna Iacono (Season 1) and Aviella Kibel (Season 2) as Cottontail Rabbit
JB Blanc (54 episodes, 2012–2016) as Tommy Brock, Mr. Bouncer, Ginger and Jack Sharp
Mark A. Huckerby as Mr. Tod
Dave B. Mitchell as Mr. McGregor and Old Brown
Gwenfair Vaughan as Mrs. Tiggywinkle
Sarah Bolt as Jemima Puddle-Duck (Seasons 1–2) and Mrs. Bobtail (Season 1)
Katie Koslowski as Josephine Rabbit (Season 2) and Mrs. Bobtail (Season 2)
Kirk Thornton as Jeremy Fisher and Pickles
Shawn Curran as Sammy Whiskers and Dr. Warren Bobtail
Spike Spencer as The Shrew and Felix
Joshua Colley as Pig Robinson
David McCamley (23 episodes, 2014–2015)
Dino Athanassiou (23 episodes, 2014–2015)
Cole Meyer Carandang (23 episodes, 2014–2015)
Jennifer Fox (1 episode, 2015)

Characters

Main
Peter Rabbit – The main protagonist of the series. A mischievous, curious, quick-witted, street smart, imaginative and adventurous young rabbit. He is also the eldest of his siblings. Unlike the character from the books, this version of Peter Rabbit lacks shoes. He also can be very hot-headed. Peter's catchphrases are "a good rabbit never gives up!", and "let's hop to it!" (voiced by Colin DePaula throughout Season 1 and recast by L. Parker Lucas throughout Season 2 in the U.S., and voiced by Connor Fitzgerald in the UK.)
Benjamin Bunny –  Peter's cousin who joins him on his adventures. Unlike the character from the books, this Benjamin is shorter and younger than Peter. He is also portrayed as being cowardly, wimpy, clumsy, hungry and clueless but also very good-natured, loyal, and kind (voiced by Peter Steve Harris in the US, Danny Price in the UK). Benjamin's catchphrase is "rabbits are brave, rabbits are brave...", which he says when he is scared.
Lily Bobtail – Peter and Benjamin's quick-witted female best friend, who carries many useful objects in her pocket. Unlike cousins Peter and Benjamin who were based on the books by Beatrix Potter, Lily is a newcomer who was created by the production team for the series. She carries many things in a pocket on her dress. (She is voiced by Michaela Dean in the U.S., Harriet Perring in the UK.) Lily's catchphrase is "I know that for a fact!", and "just in case pocket, just in case!"
Mr. Tod – The main antagonist of the series. A red fox who consistently fails to hunt down, capture, and devour the protagonists and other supporting characters. (voiced by Mark Huckerby)
Squirrel Nutkin – A short-tailed squirrel and the leader of the squirrels' tribe. He is Peter's squirrel friend who saves Peter whenever he gets captured by Mr. Tod. His tail was cut off by Old Brown. (Voiced by Kyle Dean Massey in the U.S. and Nigel Pilkington in the UK. His right-hand man is Felix, voiced by Spike Spencer.)
Josephine Rabbit– Widow of Mr. Rabbit. Mother of Peter, Cotton-tail, Flopsy and Mopsy. Aunt of Benjamin. Sister of Mr. Bouncer. (Voiced by Stephanie Sheh (Season 1) and Kate Koslowski (Season 2).)
Flopsy and Mopsy – Peter's younger, ignorant, arrogant, bossy and smug twin sisters. They are also triplets still, Mopsy the older twin, and Flopsy the younger twin, the middle daughters. Benjamin's twin cousins. (Voiced by Megan Taylor Harvey (Season 1) and Brittany Harms and Sawyer Niehaus, respectively (Season 2).)
Cottontail – Peter, Flopsy and Mopsy's baby sister. Benjamin's youngest cousin. (Voiced by Jenna Iacono (Season 1) and Aviella Kibel (Season 2).)
Mr. Bouncer – Benjamin's single father. Uncle of Peter, Cotton-tail, Flopsy and Mopsy. Brother of Josephine. Brother-in-law of Mr. Rabbit. He likes to invent many things (often they all go wrong). (Voiced by John White.)

Supporting
Jeremy Fisher – A frog that Peter, Benjamin, and Lily accidentally cause trouble for on occasion. He enjoys fishing and was friend with Peter's father. He has a huge passion for music, but can't really sing. (He is voiced by Kirk Thornton.)
Jemima Puddle-Duck – A kind yet very simple-minded duck that knows Peter and his friends well. She has three ducklings. (She is voiced by Sarah Bolt.)
Mrs. Tiggy-Winkle – A hedgehog, washerwoman and one of the many townspeople Peter interacts with. She speaks with an Irish accent. (She is voiced by Gwenfair Vaughan.)
Ginger and Pickles – A cat and dog who run the village shop. Pickles is quite gruff while Ginger is a bit more respectful of their customers. (voiced by JB Blanc and Kirk Thornton, respectively).
Mr. McGregor – A human farmer whose vegetables are the target of Peter. His face is kept hidden. He is portrayed as an old man who gets winded often. Also, he speaks with a Scottish accent. (He is voiced by Dave Mitchell.)
Tommy Brock – An irritable badger that finds Peter and his friends obnoxious when they wake him up or disturb his possessions. He enjoys eating worms. (He voiced by John White.)
Old Brown – A short-tempered owl that wants nothing but silence. Thus, he would attack anyone who makes a sound within his vicinity. He constantly chases after Nutkin for disrupting the peace. (He voiced by Dave Mitchell.)
Samuel Whiskers – A rat whose full name is Samuel Jeremiah Bartholomew Edmond Cornelius Whiskers. He is always after an easy meal, preferably cakes and baked sweets and often attempts to steal food from the other characters. (He is voiced by Shawn Curran.)
Dr. Warren Bobtail – Lily's father. The Rabbits' family doctor, he has a strong sense of smell. (He is also voiced by Shawn Curran.)
Mrs. Bobtail – Warren's wife and Lily's mother. (She is voiced by Sarah Bolt.)
Pig Robinson –  A friendly pig that lives on a farm with his best friend Mittens. He loves to paint on his easel and tries mostly to befriend everyone he meets.
Mittens –  A young cat that lives on a farm with her best friend Pig Robinson. While somewhat hostile to Lily, Peter, and Benjamin at first, she eventually warms up to them. She is aggressive towards any rodents, and abhorred the idea of Tommy Brock moving in her farm.
Mr. Tolly – A tortoise, that, over his many years, has acquainted with many of Peter Rabbit's friends, enemies, as well as Peter's father with whom he went on many adventures with alongside Jeremy Fisher and Mr Bouncer.
Jack Sharp – A three-spined stickleback that once knew Mr. Rabbit. Often fights with Jeremy Fisher.
The Shrew – A shrew whose territory possesses a bountiful field of dandelions, which he guards against Peter Rabbit, or any other animal. He once tracked down Peter to his burrow to demand the return of dandelions picked by Peter and his friends. He is the object of Cotton-tail's affection, much to his dismay.
The Tittlemouse siblings – Albert, Louisa and Stanley are two brothers and one sister mice siblings that are always trying to survive.

Fifty six episodes of the series have been aired as of 2016. Except "Peter Rabbit's Christmas Tale", all episode titles begin with "The Tale of". The American dub did not title the episodes like that in season 2.

Episodes

Series overview

Season 1 (2012–14)

Season 2 (2014–16)

Broadcast
Presently, it is airing in Canada on Treehouse TV which also has games. In the United Kingdom, it currently airs on CBeebies and streaming services including Netflix and Amazon Prime Video.

Home media
Peter Rabbit (May 28, 2013)

Christmas Tale (November 12, 2013)

Spring Into Adventure (February 18, 2014)

Peter Rabbit: Season One was released on October 8, 2015, exclusively at Amazon.com. This release contains 4 discs. It is published on demand onto DVD-Rs.

Reception
The series was met with mostly positive reviews.
"Peter Rabbit's Christmas Tale" (Dec 14, at 7 p.m. ET/PT), drew 3 million total viewers and ranked as the number-one program with K2-5 and K2-11 across all TV in its time period. It was also the top-rated and most-watched preschool telecast for the week, posting double and triple-digit gains over last year with K2-5 (6.7/891,000, +196%) and K2-11 (4.7/1.6 million, +22%); and A18-49 (.9/940,000, +73%), making it the week's top preschool telecast.

According to 'By The Numbers', Nickelodeon's brand-new animated series Peter Rabbit hopped to the top of the charts, with its Tuesday, Feb 19 premiere, which delivered 1.7 million total viewers. The new CG-animated series was also basic cable's top telecast in its time period (12-12:30 p.m. ET/PT) with K2-5, A18-49, W18-49 and total viewers, posting double-digit gains for the net with K2-5 (5.7/760,000, +21%), A18-49 (+47%), W18-49 (+43%) and total viewers (+31%).

CBeebies broadcasts of the programme have been equally successful with the broadcast on Christmas morning 2012 on BBC1 earning it the highest ratings on any channel in that timeslot.

At the 2014 Emmy Awards, the programme earned three daytime Emmys and scored another five nominations, earning the most nominations for an animated programme that year.

References

External links
 

Official website

Peter Rabbit
BBC children's television shows
2012 British television series debuts
2016 British television series endings
2010s British animated television series
2010s British children's television series
2012 Irish television series debuts
2016 Irish television series endings
Irish children's animated adventure television series
Irish children's animated comedy television series
British children's animated adventure television series
British children's animated comedy television series
English-language television shows
British preschool education television series
British computer-animated television series
Irish preschool education television series
Animated preschool education television series
2010s preschool education television series
Television series by Sony Pictures Television
Television series by Brown Bag Films
British television shows based on children's books
Animated television series about rabbits and hares
CBeebies
Nick Jr. original programming
Treehouse TV original programming